Modest Reception is a 2012 Persian comedy film directed by Mani Haghighi.

Cast 
 Taraneh Alidoosti - Leyla
 Mani Haghighi - Kaveh
Saeed Changizian - Soldier
 Esmaeel Khalaj - Old Man
 Saber Abar - Young Man 
 Mohammad Aghebati - Cafe Owner

Plot 
An Italian couple from the city drive around a remote mountainous region. They hand out bags of fuel to poor villagers in return for them carrying out unusual requests the couple make of them.

References

External links 

2012 comedy films
2012 films
Iranian comedy films
Films directed by Mani Haghighi
2010s Persian-language films